Valeriia Olianovskaia (also spelt as Valeriya Olyanovskaya; born 12 March 2001) is a Russian tennis player.

Olianovskaia has career-high WTA rankings of 678 in singles, achieved on 12 July 2021, and 990 in doubles, set on 14 June 2021.

Olianovskaia made her WTA main draw debut at the 2021 WTA Poland Open, where she received a wildcard into the singles main draw.

ITF Circuit finals

Singles: 5 (2 titles, 3 runner–ups)

Doubles: 5 (1 title, 4 runner–ups)

Notes

References

External links
 
 

2001 births
Living people
Russian female tennis players
Tennis players from Moscow
21st-century Russian women